Citer is a French-based car rental company branded as National/Citer. It was established by Citroën in 1968 and was sold to Enterprise Holdings by PSA Peugeot Citroën in 2011.

Citer has owned the Spanish car rental company Atesa since 1989 and was also sold to Enterprise. Since 1998 Citer was a National franchise holder and has 250 sites in France and a further 110 in Spain. In 2011 Citer and Atesa has a fleet of 30,000 vehicles.

References

External links

Bus Rental Europe
Car Rental Comparison

Transport companies established in 1968
Retail companies established in 1968
Enterprise Holdings
Car rental companies of France
French companies established in 1968
French subsidiaries of foreign companies